Anastasia Kristina Vaipan-Law (born 31 August 1999) is a Scottish figure skater who currently represents Great Britain in pairs. With her partner, Luke Digby, she is 2021–22 British national champion.

Personal life 
Vaipan-Law was born on 31 August 1999 in Blackpool, England.

Career

Early years and singles career 
Vaipan-Law began learning how to skate in 2007 at the age of eight in Dundee, Scotland. She made her junior international debut in women's single skating at the 2013 NRW Trophy in December 2013 where she finished 21st.

Throughout her career as a single skater, Vaipan-Law competed at three ISU Junior Grand Prix assignments and placed second at the 2016 Open d'Andorra in the junior women's event. She is a three-time British junior national silver medalist (2017-2019).

Vaipan-Law began contemplating switching to pair skating after suffering a knee injury and undergoing surgery. She officially began her pair skating career in December 2019 when she teamed up with partner Luke Digby.

2021–22 season: Pairs debut with Digby 
Vaipan-Law/Digby made their international debut as a team at the 2021 CS Finlandia Trophy. They finished 12th overall and recorded personal bests in all three segments of competition. The team competed at three more events throughout the fall, winning the 2021 Tayside Trophy and finishing fourth and 17th at the 2021 Trophee Metropole Nice Cote d'Azur and the 2021 CS Warsaw Cup respectively.

At their first British Championships in November, Vaipan-Law/Digby narrowly took the title ahead of the long-dominant team Zoe Jones / Christopher Boyadji. Jones/Boyadji initially received the assignment to Great Britain's single berth in the pairs' field at the 2022 European Figure Skating Championships, but after Jones recorded a positive COVID-19 test shortly before the event, Vaipan-Law/Digby were assigned to replace them.

Vaipan-Law/Digby set a new personal best in the short program at 2022 Europeans but finished 18th in the segment and did not advance to the free skate.

Programs

With Digby

Competitive highlights

Pairs with Digby 
GP: ISU Grand Prix; CS: ISU Challenger Series

Women's singles 
JGP: ISU Junior Grand Prix

References

External links 

 
 

1999 births
Living people
Scottish figure skaters
British female pair skaters
British female single skaters